Philip Graham Ryken (born 1966) is an American theologian, Presbyterian minister, and academic administrator. He is the eighth and current president of Wheaton College in Wheaton, Illinois.

Early life and education
Ryken was born on September 29, 1966. He received a Bachelor of Arts degree in English literature and philosophy from Wheaton College in 1988. He also completed a Master of Divinity degree from Westminster Theological Seminary in 1992 and a Doctor of Philosophy degree in historical theology from University of Oxford in 1995.

Professional life
Ryken is an ordained teaching elder in the Presbyterian Church in America.  He joined the pastoral staff of historic Tenth Presbyterian Church in Philadelphia in 1995 and was elevated to the position of senior minister upon the death of James Boice in 2000. In February 2010, the Board of Trustees at Wheaton College announced his selection as the college's eighth president, succeeding the retiring Duane Litfin. Ryken took office on July 1, 2010, and was formally inaugurated on September 17, 2010, at Edman Chapel.

He is a member of the Alliance of Confessing Evangelicals, serving as a member of the alliance council, which features his expository preaching on its weekly national radio and internet broadcast, Every Last Word.

Scholarship
He has written over thirty books on a wide variety of Christian subjects, including:
Art for God's Sake: A Call to Recover the Arts
Written in Stone: The Ten Commandments and Today's Moral Crisis
The Doctrines of Grace: Rediscovering the Evangelical Gospel with James Montgomery Boice and R. C. Sproul
Discovering God in Stories from the Bible

Ryken has also coauthored a series of commentaries on individual books of the Bible with R. Kent Hughes. Ryken and his father, literary scholar Leland Ryken, have collaborated to produce a study Bible, and the father-son team worked with James Wilhoit to write Ryken's Bible Handbook, which focuses on the literary genres and styles in each book of the Bible.

Personal life
Ryken is the son of the Christian literary scholar and Wheaton professor Leland Ryken.  Ryken met his wife, Lisa, while the two were students at Wheaton. They were married after their junior year. The couple have five children, and reside in Wheaton. He is known to enjoy waterskiing, basketball, soccer, golf, and poetry.

Works

Books

References

External links
Alliance of Confessing Evangelicals
Every Last Word broadcast
Tenth Presbyterian Church
Wheaton College

1966 births
Alumni of Regent's Park College, Oxford
American evangelicals
Heads of universities and colleges in the United States
Living people
People from Wheaton, Illinois
Presbyterian Church in America ministers
Westminster Theological Seminary alumni
Wheaton College (Illinois) alumni